Nils Petter Håkedal (born 4 April 1968) is a Norwegian sports shooter. He competed at the 1992 Summer Olympics and the 1996 Summer Olympics.

References

1968 births
Living people
Norwegian male sport shooters
Olympic shooters of Norway
Shooters at the 1992 Summer Olympics
Shooters at the 1996 Summer Olympics
Sportspeople from Tønsberg
20th-century Norwegian people